Nagarahole is a 1977 Indian Kannada-language children's film written by H. V. Subba Rao, with screenplay and direction by S. V. Rajendra Singh Babu, starring Vishnuvardhan, Bharathi and Ambareesh. The film was dubbed in Malayalam as Kaadu Njangalude Veedu and in Hindi as Bahadur Bachhe. Director Babu had revealed that the base plotline was inspired by the books of Enid Blyton. He had also revealed that the movie was dubbed in 11 languages including Russian, Japanese & French.

Plot
A school trip to the Nagarhole National Park turns dangerous for the children. The teachers are caught in a bind. The trip turns lucky for the principal (Bharathi) when she meets her lost husband (Vishnuvardhan).

Cast

 Bharathi 
 Vishnuvardhan
 Ambareesh
 Kanchana (actress)
 B. V. Radha
 Baby Indira
 Prasad Tagat
 Shivaram
 Uma Shivakumar	
 Sundar Krishna Urs
 M. S. Umesh
 Shakti Prasad
 Dinesh
 Chethan Ramarao

Production
Rajendra Singh Babu wanted to make a children's adventure film completely set in a forest being inspired by the books written by Enid Blyton. He approached celebrated Kannada writer H. V. Subba Rao who went for a recce to Nagarahole for 15 days with the added sub plot of naxalites lurking around the forest. H. V. Subba Rao penned an original adventure story, and dialogues for the pathbreaking film.

The character of Ambareesh was based on a real life driver whom Babu met during the stay there. Babu revealed that the team struggled hard to shoot scenes like a tiger carrying a little boy and manchan scene, which took around 75 takes. The climax sequence were shot on the Sakleshpura Bridge with 13 tunnels at 165 ft in height and it was Asia's highest bridge. The film which began production in 1974 was not released until 1977 due to lack of takers.

The film was dubbed in Hindi and  released in Mumbai and all over India and became very popular among kids of that generation. The story of some kids lost in a jungle full of wild animals, surviving on their own with no adult to protect them and yet having an adventure of their life, was something which captured the imagination of kids like no other film of that era.

Soundtrack
The title song "Ille Swarga Ille Naraka" was sung Ravi, and released in 2004 by Saregama.

 "Ee Notake Mai Maatake" singers: Bharathi, Vishnuvardhan lyrics: Chi Udayashankar	
 "Ille Swarga Ille Naraka" singer: Ravi lyrics: Chi Udayashankar
 "Hey Hey Piltu Hey Hey Chiltu" singers: P. B. Sreenivas, S. Janaki, lyrics: R. N. Jayagopal
 "Naagaraholeyo Ammaale" singers: S. P. Balasubrahmanyam, S. Janaki, lyrics: Vijaya Narasimha

Recognition
 Won Karnataka State Film Awards for 'best child actor' 1976-1977 for Prasad Tagat, Bhanuprakash, Sathish and Baby Indira

References

External links
 Nagarhole at the Internet Movie Database

1977 films
1970s Kannada-language films
Films scored by Satyam (composer)
Indian children's films
Films set in forests
Indian adventure films
Films directed by Rajendra Singh Babu